Mondher Zenaidi (born 24 October 1950) is a Tunisian politician. He served in the government of Tunisia as Minister of Public Health from 2007 to 2011. Prior to this, he was Secretary of State for Trade and Industry, Minister of Transport, and Minister of Commerce.

Education
Mondher Zenaidi was born on October 24, 1950 in Tunis. He graduated from the École centrale Paris in 1973 and the École nationale d'administration in 1976.

Political career
He served as Chief of Cabinet of the Ministry of Health, General Director of the Tunisian National Office for Tourism, and General Director of the Tunisian Office of Commerce. In 1991, he was elected Vice-President of the Tunisian Parliament. He was appointed as Secretary of State for Trade and Industry, then as Minister of Transport in 1994, Minister of Commerce in 1996, Minister of Commerce and Tourism in 2002, Minister of Commerce and Handicraft. In 2007, he was appointed as Minister of Public Health.

He was a board member of the Constitutional Democratic Rally. He was elected as sixty-third President of the World Health Assembly. He has been involved with the World Trade Organization and the Organisation of the Islamic Conference.

References

1950 births
People from Tunis
Government ministers of Tunisia
Living people